Morgan Moses (born March 3, 1991) is an American football offensive tackle for the Baltimore Ravens of the National Football League (NFL). He played college football at Virginia and was drafted by the Washington Redskins in the third round of the 2014 NFL Draft.

Early life and college
Moses attended Meadowbrook High School in North Chesterfield, Virginia where he was a two-time all-state, all-region and all-district selection. After originally committing to Virginia, he played one year of prep football at Fork Union Military Academy in order to become academically qualified to attend the University of Virginia to play for the Virginia Cavaliers.

Moses started all 12 games at left tackle during his senior year with the Cavaliers, finishing his career with 43 starts. He earned third-team All-ACC honors.

Professional career

Washington Redskins / Football Team

Moses was drafted by the Washington Redskins in the third round (66th overall) of the 2014 NFL Draft. He signed a four-year, $3.05 million contract on May 29, 2014. He started only one game that season and was placed on injured reserve that December because of a lisfranc injury.

During training camp of his second season in 2015, Moses won the starting right tackle job despite initial belief that new first round draft pick, Brandon Scherff, would win the job. Scherff instead became the starting right guard. On April 27, 2017, Moses signed a five-year contract extension with the Redskins.

In Week 10 of the 2020 season, Moses filled in at left tackle after Cornelius Lucas left in the second half of the game with an injury. The following week, Moses switched over and started at left tackle in the win against the Cincinnati Bengals. In Week 13, Moses returned to playing right tackle after Lucas was able to return. He was released on May 20, 2021.

New York Jets
Moses signed a one-year, $3.6 million deal with the New York Jets on July 2, 2021.

Baltimore Ravens
On March 16, 2022, Moses signed a three-year, $15 million contract with the Baltimore Ravens.

References

External links
Baltimore Ravens bio
Virginia Cavaliers bio

1991 births
Living people
American football offensive tackles
New York Jets players
Players of American football from Richmond, Virginia
Virginia Cavaliers football players
Washington Redskins players
Washington Football Team players
Baltimore Ravens players
Ed Block Courage Award recipients